Wular Lake, also known as Wolar in Kashmiri, is one of the largest fresh water lakes in South Asia. It is located near Bandipora town in the Bandipora district of Jammu and Kashmir, India. The lake basin was formed as a result of tectonic activity and is fed by the Jhelum River and stream Madhumati and Arin.

The lake's size varies seasonally from 30 to 189 square kilometres. In addition, much of the lake has been drained as a result of willow plantations being built on the shore in the 1950s.

Etymology
In ancient times, Wular Lake was also called Mahapadmasar (Sanskrit: महापद्मसरः). Nilamata Purana also mentions it as Mahapadmasaras. The lake, with its big dimensions and the extent of water, gives rise to high leaping waves in the afternoons, called Ullola in Sanskrit, meaning "stormy leaping, high rising waves". Therefore, it was also being called Ullola. It is believed to have gotten corrupted over the centuries to Wulor or Wular. The origin may also be attributed to a Kashmiri word 'Wul', which means a gap or a fissure, appellation that must have come also during this period. The word Wul (gap or fissure), is also an indicator of its origin to a fissure or gap created.

Natural history
The lake is one of the 75 Indian wetlands designated as a Ramsar site. However it faces environmental threats including the conversion of large parts of the lake's catchment areas into agriculture land, pollution from fertilizers and animal wastes, hunting of waterfowl and migratory birds, and weed infestation in the lake itself.

Fish
Wular Lake is an important fish habitat, the main species being the common carp (Cyprinus carpio), rosy barb (Barbus conchonius), mosquitofish (Gambusia affinis), Nemacheilus species, Crossocheilus latius, and various snowtrout species in the genera Schizopyge and Schizothorax. Snowtrout species identified in the lake include the Sattar snowtrout (Schizopyge curvifrons), Chirruh snowtrout (Schizopyge esocinus), Schizothorax planifrons, Schizothorax macropogon, Schizothorax longipinus and Chush snowtrout (Schizopyge niger).

Fish from Wular Lake make up a significant part of the diet for many thousands of people living on its shores and elsewhere in the Kashmir Valley. More than eight thousand fishermen earn their livelihood from the lake, primarily fishing for the endemic Schizothorax species and the non-native carp. Their catch comprises about 60 percent of the total yield of fish in Kashmir. Hundreds of other local villagers are employed by cooperative societies that trade the fish catch. Many other families harvest plants such as the grass Phragmites and the waterlily-like Nymphoides from the lake for animal fodder.

Birds
The lake sustains a rich population of birds. Terrestrial birds observed around the lake include the black-eared kite, Eurasian sparrowhawk, short-toed eagle, Himalayan golden eagle, Himalayan monal, chukar partridge, koklass pheasant, rock dove, common cuckoo, alpine swift, Indian roller, Himalayan woodpecker, hoopoe, barn swallow, golden oriole and others.

History
The Kashmiri sultan Zain-ul-Abidin is reputed to have ordered the construction of the artificial island of Zaina Lank in the middle of the lake in 1444.
According to the traditional beliefs in the vicinity of Wular Lake there once stood a city whose king was Raja Sudrasen. By the reason of the enormity of his crimes, the waters of the lake rose and drowned him and his subjects. It was said that during the winter months, at low water the ruins of the submerged idol temple might be seen rising from the lake. Zayn Ul Aabidin constructed a spacious barge which he sank in the lake and upon which he laid a foundation of bricks and stones till it rose high enough to be at level with the water. Upon this he erected a Mosque and other buildings and gave the islet the name of Lanka. The expense of this work was defrayed by the fortunate discovery of two idols of solid gold which had been brought up from the lake by divers.

Tulbul Project
The Tulbul Project is a "navigation lock-cum-control structure" at the mouth of Wular Lake. The project was conceived in the early 1980s and work began in 1984. The average annual inflows or outflows from the lake is nearly 7 billion cubic meters

There has been an ongoing dispute between India and Pakistan over the Tulbul Project since 1987, when Pakistan objected that it violated the 1960 Indus Waters Treaty (IWT). India stopped work on the project that year, but has since pressed to restart construction. The Jhelum River passing through the Kashmir valley below Wular Lake which is a connecting lake as per IWT, provides an important means of transport for goods and people. To sustain navigation throughout the year, a minimum depth of water is needed. India contends that the Tulbul Project is permissible per paragraphs 7 (c) and 9 of Annexure E, IWT while Pakistan maintains that the project is a violation of the treaty if the storage is above  for non-power generation purpose. India says suspension of work is harming the interests of people of Jammu and Kashmir and also depriving irrigation and power benefits to the people of Pakistan that may accrue from regulated water releases.

The lake storage capacity can be increased per IWT to 300,000 acre feet or more up to 1580 m MSL by considering it as a reservoir for a run of the river (RoR) hydro power plant by envisaging a low head (nearly 8 meters rated head) power plant. The available deepened river bed level at the toe of the dam can be below  MSL for 4,000 cusecs flow. Simultaneously, the enlarged lake can also meet the downstream navigational requirements fully during the lean flow season. The regulated buffer / surcharge water storage in the Wular lake would substantially enhance the power generation from the downstream Lower Jhelum (105 MW), Uri (720 MW), proposed 1124 MW Kohala (in PaK), proposed 720 MW Azad Pattan (in PaK), 590-MW Mahl hydropower project (in PaK) and proposed 720 MW Karot (in PaK) RoR hydel projects though its own power plant's generation is marginal. Construction of a RoR power plant with sufficient sluice gates would also flush the sediment from the lake area to preserve the lake.

The lean season water inflows into the Wular Lake are enhanced from the Kishanganga river by the Kishanganga Hydroelectric Plant after generating electricity.

Other lakes such as Manasbal Lake, Anchar Lake, Dal Lake, etc. which are not located on Jhelum Main river can be used similar to Wular Lake to impound flood waters for flood protection in downstream areas, hydro electricity generation, navigation throughout the year, irrigation, municipal and industrial uses.

Recognition
In recognition of its biological, hydrological and socio-economic values, the lake was included in 1986 as a Wetland of National Importance under the Wetlands Programme of the Ministry of Environment and Forests, Government of India for intensive conservation and management purposes. Subsequently, in 1990, it was designated as a Wetland of International Importance under the Ramsar Convention. Against the Ramsar Conventions, the lake area is being used for garbage dumping.

Restoration
Amongst other developments, two million trees will be cut to restore Wular Lake under the National Lake Conservation Programme. The Environment Ministry of India approved Rs 4 billion for the restoration project for the lake that will take 5 to 10 years and was after long delays scheduled to start in December 2011.
The partner organisation South Asian Voluntary Association of Environmentalists (SAVE) is a joint initiative of individuals with the aim to protect the ecology and to conserve the nature at Wular Lake.

Tourism
Boating, water sports and water skiing have been launched by the Government of India Tourism in collaboration with Kerala Tourism and J&K Tourism. The contract for the operation of the site was awarded in September 2011.

See also 

 Anchar Lake
 Dal Lake
 Gangbal Lake
 Manasbal Lake
 Hathlangoo
 2014 India–Pakistan floods
 Khanpursar

References

Further reading

 Wetlands International, 2007. Comprehensive Management Action Plan for Wular Lake, Kashmir. jkwildlife.org.

Ramsar sites in India
Lakes of Jammu and Kashmir
Bandipora district
Islands of India
Uninhabited islands of India